Jarosław Niezgoda (born 15 March 1995) is a Polish professional footballer who plays as a striker for Portland Timbers in Major League Soccer.

Career
He was acquired by Portland in January 2020. He suffered a torn ACL during a November 2020 match against Vancouver.

Career statistics

Club

1 Including Polish Super Cup.

Honours
Legia Warsaw
Ekstraklasa: 2016–17, 2017–18, 2019–20
Polish Cup: 2017–18

Portland Timbers
MLS is Back Tournament: 2020

References

External links
 
 

Living people
1995 births
Association football forwards
Polish footballers
Poland under-21 international footballers
Ekstraklasa players
Legia Warsaw players
Ruch Chorzów players
People from Opole Lubelskie County
Wisła Puławy players
Portland Timbers players
Designated Players (MLS)
Portland Timbers 2 players
Major League Soccer players
USL Championship players
Polish expatriate footballers
Polish expatriate sportspeople in the United States